Pelatantheria woonchengii is a species of epiphytic or lithophytic orchid occurring in Vietnam, Thailand, Myanmar, and Malaysia. It may be easily misidentified as Pelatantheria ctenoglossum.

Description
The distichously arranged, fleshy, unequally bi-lobed leaves are channeled along the midvein. One to two yellow flowers with red striations on the sepals and petals are produced on a short, axillary racemes, which do not exceed the length of the leaves. Glandular hairs arise from the base of the column, similar to Pelatantheria bicuspidata and Pelatantheria ctenoglossum. However, Pelatantheria woonchengii only bears one tuft of hairs on each side of the column. Also, the callus on the midlobe is large and yellow and the disk is thickened and cushion-like.

Ecology
Flowering occurs from mid October to late November.

Conservation
This species is protected under the Convention on International Trade in Endangered Species of Wild Fauna and Flora CITES and thus is regarded as potentially endangered. Many wild populations were destroyed by overcollection.

References

woonchengii
Orchids of Myanmar
Orchids of Thailand
Orchids of Vietnam
Orchids of Malaysia